Poum is a commune in the North Province of New Caledonia.

Poum or POUM may also refer to:

POUM (Partido Obrero de Unificación Marxista), the Workers' Party of Marxist Unification, a Spanish Marxist party active in the Spanish Civil War
Poum, Struga, a village in North Macedonia
Poum Lake, a lake in Vancouver Island
AS Poum, a football team in New Caledonia

See also
K'poum, a village in the Ouo Department, Comoé Province, Burkina Faso